Molidustat (Bay 85-3934) is a drug which acts as an HIF prolyl-hydroxylase inhibitor and thereby increases endogenous production of erythropoietin, which stimulates production of hemoglobin and red blood cells. It is in Phase III clinical trials for the treatment of anemia caused by chronic kidney disease. Due to its potential applications in athletic doping, it has also been incorporated into screens for performance-enhancing drugs.

See also 
 Daprodustat
 Desidustat
 Roxadustat
 Vadadustat

References 

Pyrimidines
4-Morpholinyl compunds
Pyrazolones
Triazoles